The 1979 Big Ten Conference football season was the 84th season of college football played by the member schools of the Big Ten Conference and was a part of the 1979 NCAA Division I-A football season. 

The 1979 Ohio State Buckeyes football team compiled an 11–1 record, won the Big Ten championship, lost to USC in the 1980 Rose Bowl, and was ranked No. 4 in the final AP and UPI polls. Quarterback Art Schlichter led the team with 2,246 yards of total offense, finished fourth in the Heisman Trophy voting, and was selected as a first-team All-American by the NEA and The Sporting News. Offensive guard Ken Fritz was a consensus All-American. Earl Bruce, in his first year as head coach, was selected as the Big Ten Coach of the Year. Doug Donley led the Big Ten with 800 receiving yards, and Vlade Janakievski led the conference with 97 points scored. Defensive lineman Jim Laughlin was selected as the team's most valuable player.

The 1979 Purdue Boilermakers football team, under head coach Jim Young, finished in second place in the Big Ten, compiled a 10–2 record, defeated Tennessee in the 1979 Astro-Bluebonnet Bowl, led the conference in both scoring offense (32.5 points per game) and scoring defense (10.5 points allowed per game), and was ranked No. 10 in the final AP and UPI polls. Quarterback Mark Herrmann led the conference with 2,377 passing yards and finished eighth in the Heisman Trophy voting. Tight end Dave Young was selected as the team's most valuable player.

The 1979 Michigan Wolverines football team, under head coach Bo Schembechler, compiled an 8–4 record, finished third in the Big Ten, lost to North Carolina in the 1979 Gator Bowl, and was ranked No. 18 in the final AP poll. Linebacker Ron Simpkins was selected as the team's most valuable player and as a consensus All-American. Defensive end Curtis Greer was also selected as a first-team All-American by multiple selectors. Butch Woolfolk ranked second in the Big Ten with 990 rushing yards.

Season overview

Results and team statistics

Key
AP final = Team's rank in the final AP Poll of the 1979 season
AP high = Team's highest rank in the AP Poll throughout the 1979 season
PPG = Average of points scored per game; conference leader's average displayed in bold
PAG = Average of points allowed per game; conference leader's average displayed in bold
MVP = Most valuable player as voted by players on each team as part of the voting process to determine the winner of the Chicago Tribune Silver Football trophy; trophy winner in bold

Regular season

September 8
On September 8, 1979, the Big Ten football teams played four conference games and two non-conference games. The non-conference games resulted in two wins.

 Purdue 41, Wisconsin 20
 Michigan 49, Northwestern 7
 Indiana 30, Iowa 26 
 Michigan State 33, Illinois 16
 Ohio State 31, Syracuse 8
 Minnesota 24, Ohio 10

September 15
On September 15, 1979, the Big Ten teams played one conference games and eight non-conference games.  The non-conference games resulted in four wins and four losses, giving the Big Ten a 6–4 record to that point in the season.

 Ohio State 21, Minnesota 17
 UCLA 31, Purdue 21
 Notre Dame 12, Michigan 10
 Indiana 44, Vanderbilt 13
 Oklahoma 21, Iowa 6
 Michigan State 41, Oregon 17
 Wisconsin 38, Air Force 0
 Missouri 14, Illinois 6
 Northwestern 27, Wyoming 22

September 22
On September 22, 1979, the Big Ten teams played 10 non-conference games, resulting in six wins and four losses. The results gave the Big Ten a 12–8 record to that point in the season

 Ohio State 45, Washington State 29
 Purdue 28, Notre Dame 22
 Michigan 28, Kansas 7
 Indiana 18, Kentucky 10 
 Nebraska 24, Iowa 21
 USC 48, Minnesota 14
 Michigan State 24, Miami (OH) 21
 UCLA 37, Wisconsin 12
 Illinois 27, Air Force 19
 Syracuse 54, Northwestern 21

September 29
On September 29, 1979, the Big Ten teams played one conference game and eight non-conference games. The non-conference games resulted in four wins and four losses, giving the Big Ten a 16–12 record to that point in the season.

 Minnesota 38, Northwestern 8
 Ohio State 17, UCLA 13
 Purdue 13, Oregon 7
 Michigan 14, California 10
 Colorado 17, Indiana 16
 Iowa 30, Iowa State 14
 Notre Dame 27, Michigan State 3
 San Diego State 24, Wisconsin 17
 Navy 13, Illinois 12

October 6
On October 6, 1979, the Big Ten teams played five conference games.

 Ohio State 16, Northwestern 7
 Minnesota 31, Purdue 14
 Michigan 21, Michigan State 7
 Indiana 3, Wisconsin 0
 Iowa 13, Illinois 7

October 13
On October 13, 1979, the Big Ten teams played five conference games.

 Ohio State 47, Indiana 6
 Purdue 28, Illinois 14
 Michigan 31, Minnesota 21
 Iowa 58, Northwestern 6 
 Wisconsin 38, Michigan State 29

October 20
On October 20, 1979, the Big Ten teams played five conference games.

 Ohio State 59, Wisconsin 0
 Purdue 14, Michigan State 7
 Michigan 27, Illinois 7
 Indiana 30, Northwestern 0
 Minnesota 24, Iowa 7

October 27
On October 27, 1979, the Big Ten teams played five conference games.

 Ohio State 42, Michigan State 0
 Purdue 20, Northwestern 16
 Michigan 27, Indiana 21
 Iowa 24, Wisconsin 13
 Illinois 17, Minnesota 17

November 3
On November 3, 1979, the Big Ten teams played five conference games.

 Ohio State 44, Illinois 7
 Purdue 20, Iowa 14
 Michigan 54, Wisconsin 0
 Indiana 42, Minnesota 24
 Michigan State 42, Northwestern 7

November 10
On November 10, 1979, the Big Ten teams played five conference games.

 Ohio State 34, Iowa 7
 Purdue 24, Michigan 21
 Indiana 45, Illinois 14
 Minnesota 31, Michigan State 17
 Wisconsin 28, Northwestern 3

November 17
On November 17, 1979, the Big Ten teams played five conference games.

 Ohio State 18, Michigan 15
 Purdue 37, Indiana 21
 Iowa 33, Michigan State 23
 Wisconsin 42, Minnesota 37
 Illinois 29, Northwestern 13

Bowl games

1980 Rose Bowl

1979 Astro-Bluebonnet Bowl

1979 Gator Bowl

1979 Holiday Bowl

Statistical leaders

Passing yards 
1. Mark Herrmann, Purdue (2,377)
2. Mark Carlson, Minnesota (2,188)
3. Tim Clifford, Indiana (2,078)
4. Art Schlichter, Ohio State (1,816)
5. John Wangler, Michigan (1,431)

Rushing yards
1. Dennis Mosley, Iowa (1,267)
2. Butch Woolfolk, Michigan (990)
3. Steve Smith, Michigan State (972)
4. Calvin Murray, Ohio State (872)
5. Garry White, Minnesota (861)

Receiving yards
1. Doug Donley, Ohio State (800)
2. Tom Stauss, Wisconsin (660)
3. Todd Sheets, Northwestern (614)
4. Doug Marsh, Michigan (612)
5. Bart Burrell, Purdue (607)

Total offense
1. Art Schlichter, Ohio State (2,246)
2. Tim Clifford, Indiana (2,158)
3. Mark Carlson, Minnesota (2,149)
4. Mark Herrmann, Purdue (2,094)
5. John Wangler, Michigan (1,455)

Passing efficiency rating
1. Art Schlichter, Ohio State (145.9)
2. Mark Carlson, Minnesota (125.7)
3. Tim Clifford, Indiana (Indiana	124.1)
4. Mark Herrmann, Purdue (120.0)
5. Phil Suess, Iowa (118.0)

Rushing yards per attempt
1. Garry White, Minnesota (6.4)
2. Ben McCall, Purdue (5.6)
3. Lawrence Reid, Michigan (5.4)
4. Mike Holmes, Illinois (5.4)
5. Derek Hughes, Michigan State (5.3)

Yards per reception
1. Doug Donley, Ohio State (21.6)
2. Gary Williams, Ohio State (19.2)
3. Eugene Byrd, Michigan State (18.6)
4. Doug Marsh, Michigan (18.5)
5. Tom Stauss, Wisconsin (17.4)

Points scored
1. Vlade Janakievski, Ohio State (97)
2. Dennis Mosley, Iowa (96)
3. Butch Woolfolk, Michigan (78)
4. Marion Barber, Jr., Minnesota (72)
5. Derek Hughes, Michigan State (66)

Awards and honors

All-Big Ten honors

The following players were picked by the Associated Press (AP) and/or the United Press International (UPI) as first-team players on the 1979 All-Big Ten Conference football team.

Offense

Defense

All-American honors

At the end of the 1979 season, two Big Ten players were consensus first-team picks for the 1979 College Football All-America Team. The Big Ten's consensus All-Americans were:

Other Big Ten players who were named first-team All-Americans by at least one selector were:

Other awards

 Heisman Trophy voting: Ohio State quarterback Art Schlichter (fourth); and Purdue quarterback Mark Herrmann (eighth)

 Big Ten Coach of the Year: Earle Bruce of Ohio State.

1979 NFL Draft
The 1980 NFL Draft was held in New York on April 29-30, 1979. The following players were among the first 100 picks:

References